Wissahickon Valley Park is a large urban park in Northwest Philadelphia, Pennsylvania. It protects  of woodland surrounding the Wissahickon Creek between the Montgomery County border and the Schuylkill River. For several miles, the creek winds through a dramatic wooded gorge known as the Wissahickon Valley, a National Natural Landmark.

Forbidden Drive runs the length of the valley, a car-free gravel road popular for walking, running, cycling, and horseback riding. Side trails lead from Forbidden Drive up to rugged bridle paths suitable for hiking and trail riding.

The area was considered part of Fairmount Park from 1867 until the merger of the Fairmount Park Commission and the Department of Recreation in 2010. Today, Wissahickon Valley Park is a unit of Philadelphia Parks & Recreation and remains the second-largest park in Philadelphia after Fairmount.

History
While logging and industrialization occurred in some parts of the valley in the late 18th and early 19th century, the gorge itself was known for its natural environment, inspiring religious mystics like Johannes Kelpius, writers like Edgar Allan Poe, John Greenleaf Whittier, George Lippard, and William Cobbett; and artists like Thomas Moran, James Peale, William Trost Richards, and Currier and Ives.

In 1964, a  area of the park known as the Wissahickon Valley was designated a National Natural Landmark.

Forbidden Drive
Forbidden Drive, formerly known as the Wissahickon Turnpike, is a wide rocky trail running through the Wissahickon Valley from Ten Box to Cedars House at the upper end of the Park. It is called Forbidden Drive because of a successful protest against cars being allowed to drive in the park. In 1920, the Park Commission wanted to allow cars in the park, but 1,000 protesters on horseback and 12,000 spectators on foot fought against cars on the Wissahickon Turnpike. Every year, the Wissahickon Day Parade is held to celebrate the anniversary of this protest.

Landmarks
 Valley Green Inn, a tavern built in 1850
 Wissahickon Hall, the first of numerous inns in the valley

Houses
 Cedars House
 Hermitage Mansion
 Livezey House, a colonial era mill (aka Glen Fern)
 Monastery House
 RittenhouseTown
 Thomas Mansion

Bridges
 Fingerspan Bridge
 Kitchen's Lane Bridge
 Thomas Mill Covered Bridge
 Walnut Lane Bridge 
 Wissahickon Memorial Bridge (aka the Henry Avenue Bridge)

Other
 Cresheim Creek
 Devil's Pool
 Statue of Henry H. Houston, developer of Wissahickon
 The Native American Teedyuscung and Toleration statues
 Mom Rinker's Rock

Gallery

See also

Wissahickon Trail
Fairmount Park
List of parks in Philadelphia

References

External links

 Friends of the Wissahickon
 Parks & Recreation department
 National Natural Landmark
 Visit Philly: The Wissahickon Gorge

 
Schuylkill River
Municipal parks in Philadelphia
Germantown, Philadelphia
National Natural Landmarks in Pennsylvania